William H. Hatton (also Hatten) (August 24, 1856 – March 30, 1937) was an American lumberman and politician.

Born in New Lisbon, New York, Hatton moved with his family to Fond du Lac, Wisconsin. Hatten went to a business college in Oshkosh, Wisconsin. In 1892, Hatton helped start the Little Wolf River Lumber Company in Manawa, Wisconsin. The lumber company moved to New London, Wisconsin, and Hatton bought control of the lumber company renaming the company the Hatton Lumber Company. He was president of the Hatton Lumber Company and lived for the rest of his life in New London. Hatton was also in the banking business. From 1899 to 1907, Hatton served in the Wisconsin State Senate and was a Republican. Hatton died of pneumonia in a hospital in New London, Wisconsin.

Notes

External links
Three part story about William Hatten written by Gustave Pabst, Jr., that appeared in the Milwaukee Journal in April 1940

1856 births
1937 deaths
Deaths from pneumonia in Wisconsin
People from Otsego County, New York
People from New London, Wisconsin
Businesspeople from Wisconsin
Republican Party Wisconsin state senators
People from Fond du Lac, Wisconsin